The Order of San Marino or Civil and Military Equestrian Order of Saint Marinus is an Order of Merit of San Marino.  Established 13 August 1859, the order is presented for outstanding civil or military services to the Republic, or for humanitarian, artistic, political or scientific accomplishment. It is only ever awarded to people who are not citizens of the Republic of San Marino.  

The Equestrian Order of San Marino is divided into five ranks: Knight Grand Cross, Knight Grand Officer, Knight Major Officer or Commander, Knight Officer and Knight.  The first rank of the Order is only awarded to sovereigns, members of reigning families, high state officials, or to those who have rendered extraordinary services to the Republic of San Marino.

The badge of the Order of San Marino is a birostrate cross of gold, enamelled in white.  It is flanked by four golden towers.  The badge is charged on one side with a round shield, circled in blue with the words: San Marino Protettore.  An image of Saint Marinus is in the centre of the shield.  On the other side, the San Marino coats of arms is encircled by the words Merito Civile e Militare and the badge is bordered by a golden crown.  The ribbon is of wavy silk with alternating blue and white stripes.

The Knights of the Grand Cross also have a star which is a white birostrate cross.  This is charged with a blue, round shield with the inscription: Relinquo vos liberos ab utroque homine.  It is surrounded by a garland of enamelled oak and olive branches; these are leaning against a ray of four golden beams alternating with four silver beams.  The Grand Officers of the order also have the same star, but of a smaller size.

The Order of Saint Agatha is the next lower in order of precedence.

Grades
The order is presented in five ranks:
Knight of Grand Cross (Cavaliere Gran Croce)
Knight Grand Officer (Cavaliere Grande Ufficiale)
Knight Major Officer or Commander (Cavaliere Ufficiale Maggiore o Commendatore)
Knight Officer (Cavaliere Ufficiale)
Knight (Cavaliere)

Recipients

Prominent people who have been awarded the Order of San Marino

References

External links
Honours - website of the Ministry of Foreign Affairs, International Economic Cooperation and Telecommunications (of San Marino)
Laws establishing and amending the statutes of the Order of San Marino 
Repubblica di San Marino 

Orders, decorations, and medals of San Marino
Awards established in 1859
1859 establishments in Europe